Nicholas Joseph Fuentes (born August 18, 1998) is an American  white supremacist political commentator and live streamer. A former YouTuber, his channel was permanently suspended in February 2020 for violating YouTube's hate speech policy. He is known for holding antisemitic views and denying the Holocaust. Fuentes identifies as a member of the incel movement, as a supporter of authoritarian government, and as a Catholic integralist and Christian nationalist.

Collaborating with Patrick Casey, a former leader of the neo-Nazi organization Identity Evropa in 2019, Fuentes' followers, known as Groypers, began to heckle Turning Point's Culture War Tour, including a speaking event for Donald Trump Jr. In 2020, seeking to establish a white supremacist conference to rival CPAC, Fuentes began holding the annual America First Political Action Conference (AFPAC). Fuentes attended the 2017 white supremacist rally in Charlottesville, and he later was an attendee and speaker at events preceding the 2021 United States Capitol attack. He has encouraged the use of jokes and irony among white nationalist groups, stating that it "is so important for giving a lot of cover and plausible deniability for our views".

In late November 2022, Fuentes, along with Kanye West, met with former President Donald Trump during a dinner. The meeting received significant comment from domestic and international political figures, with the debate surrounding the dinner being called "the most discomfiting moment in U.S. history in a half-century or more" for American Jews.

Early and personal life 
Fuentes was born on August 18, 1998, in the U.S state of Illinois. Fuentes lived in La Grange Park, Illinois, and attended Lyons Township High School, where he was president of the student council. He studied introductory international relations and politics during his freshman year at Boston University. He dropped out in 2017 after completing his freshman year, claiming he received threats for attending the white supremacist Unite the Right rally in Charlottesville, Virginia. He said he would transfer to Auburn University in fall 2017, saying Auburn "has better weather and better people", but ultimately did not confirm his enrollment or continue his education.

According to Fuentes, he is of Mexican descent via his paternal ancestors and is Catholic.

Fuentes identifies as an incel (or "involuntary celibate"), although some of his supporters have criticized him for being a "voluntary celibate" after he admitted that he kissed a girl while he was in high school. He has attempted to defend himself as an incel by claiming that "having sex with women is gay" and that "the only really straight heterosexual position is to be an asexual incel."

Political activities

Early activities
Fuentes began commentating on politics through a local radio and TV station hosted by his high school, where he espoused mainstream conservative views. He hosts the episodic live stream America First with Nicholas J. Fuentes, which he began in 2017 during his freshman year at Boston University. America First is characterized by Fuentes' frequent use of jokes and irony to appeal to Generation Z while providing plausible deniability for his often extreme views.

On his show in April 2017, Fuentes asserted that Muslim speech was not covered by the First Amendment and went on to say, "Who runs the media? Globalists. Time to kill the globalists" and "I want people that run CNN to be arrested and deported or hanged because this is deliberate." The publisher of the show at the time, Right Side Broadcasting Network, issued an apology, calling the comments "unacceptable" and "inappropriate". Following these and other comments, as well as publicity over his attendance of the Unite the Right rally, he left RSBN in August 2017. In February 2022, Fuentes claimed that he was fired by RSBN CEO Joe Seales.

He co-hosted the Nationalist Review podcast with another white nationalist, James Allsup, until January 2018. According to the Southern Poverty Law Center, "the two had a public falling out with each host accusing the other of laziness, impropriety and a variety of petty slights." In April 2018, Fuentes spoke at the American Renaissance conference.

Criticism of Turning Point USA
Fuentes has repeatedly criticized Turning Point USA (TPUSA) and its founder Charlie Kirk, accusing them of betraying Donald Trump by advocating in favor of mass legal immigration, support in foreign aid for the State of Israel and LGBT issues. Throughout October and November 2019, his supporters were present at many of Kirk's public speaking events, which featured guest speakers including Donald Trump Jr., Lara Trump, and Kimberly Guilfoyle. These campaigns frequently involved asking questions that prompt viewers to look up far-right and antisemitic conspiracy theories and hoaxes online. Fuentes has characterized the campaign as a grassroots effort to expose TPUSA as ideologically inconsistent with the ideology espoused by Donald Trump and other conservative populists. As a result of this campaign, some right-wing mainstream politicians and pundits disavowed Fuentes, characterizing his beliefs as extreme and out-of-touch with mainstream conservatism.

In December 2019, Fuentes harassed conservative political commentator Ben Shapiro, who was with his family at the time, outside a TPUSA event in West Palm Beach, Florida. Fuentes had confronted Shapiro to ask why he had given a speech at Stanford University bashing Fuentes. The encounter was filmed and led to criticism of Fuentes.

America First Political Action Conference 
Fuentes has received support from conservative commentator Michelle Malkin, who agreed to speak at his first annual America First Political Action Conference (AFPAC) in February 2020, and again at his second conference in February 2021. In November 2019, Malkin was fired by the Young America's Foundation after 17 years of employment over her support for Fuentes.

Fuentes hosted his second annual AFPAC event in February 2021, speaking alongside Malkin, former Iowa Representative Steve King, and current Arizona Representative Paul Gosar. Later that month, he was barred from the Hyatt Regency Orlando, where he attempted to "start a commotion" on the CPAC floor.

Fuentes was again removed from CPAC in July 2021 after harassing a journalist. At an event held across the street he said that now that he is banned from Twitter, "I have nothing to lose. This is going to be the most racist, sexist, antisemitic, Holocaust-denying speech in all of Dallas this weekend."

Fuentes hosted his third annual AFPAC event in February 2022. Georgia Representative Marjorie Taylor Greene attended the conference, while Idaho Lt. Governor Janice McGeachin and Congressman Paul Gosar prerecorded videos that were played at the event. This was criticized, including by other Republicans such as Mitt Romney. Greene later said that she did not know who the organizers of the conference were.

Relation to the January 6 Capitol attack
Fuentes was among the far-right individuals and groups who participated in the rallies that led up to the 2021 United States Capitol attack. At a pro-Trump protest in Washington, D.C., in December 2020, Fuentes led a crowd to chant "Destroy the GOP", and encouraged them to sit-out the United States Senate special runoff election in Georgia. In February 2021, a video of his speech was played during the second impeachment trial of President Donald Trump by House delegate Stacey Plaskett.

Fuentes was among a group of far-right activists and groups who received large donations in bitcoin from a French donor on December 8. Fuentes received 13.5 bitcoin (approximately $681,750 at the time), which was by far the largest share. The donor also posted an apparent suicide note, according to Blockchain analysis group Chainalysis, although the donor's status has not been confirmed. The FBI began an investigation as to whether any of this money went toward the financing of illegal acts, such as the storming of the U.S. Capitol.

On January 4, 2021, two days before the storming of the U.S. Capitol, Fuentes discussed killing state legislators who were unwilling to overturn the results of the 2020 election, saying: "What can you and I do to a state legislator—besides kill them? We should not do that. I'm not advising that, but I mean, what else can you do, right?"

On January 6, 2021, prior to the attack, Fuentes spoke to a crowd of supporters at Freedom Plaza, stating, "It is us and our ancestors that created everything good that you see in this country. All these people that have taken over our country—we do not need them. ... It is the American people, and our leader, Donald Trump, against everybody else in this country and this world... Our Founding Fathers would get in the streets, and they would take this country back by force if necessary. And that is what we must be prepared to do."

On January 19, 2022, the United States House Select Committee on the January 6 Attack issued a subpoena to Fuentes.

Meeting with Donald Trump in November 2022 
On November 22, 2022, Donald Trump hosted Fuentes and Kanye West at dinner at Trump's Mar-a-Lago residence in Florida. The meeting was at West's request. West said that Trump was "really impressed with Nick Fuentes". Trump released a statement that after contacting him earlier in the week to arrange the visit, West "unexpectedly showed up with three of his friends, whom I knew nothing about", with whom Trump dined, and that "the dinner was quick and uneventful".

Trump further elaborated several days later that he met with West to "help a seriously troubled man, who just happens to be black... who has been decimated in his business and virtually everything else". Trump also acknowledged advising West to drop out of the race.

Members of the meeting gave contradictory accounts of what occurred. According to Axios:...a source stated that Trump seemed "seemed very taken" by Fuentes and "impressed that the 24-year-old was able to rattle off statistics and recall speeches dating back to his 2016 campaign".

Paraphrasing the conversation, the source said Fuentes told the president he preferred him to be "authentic," and that Trump seemed scripted and unlike himself during his recent 2024 campaign announcement speech. Trump responded, "You like it better when I just speak off the cuff," the source said. Fuentes replied that he did, calling Trump an "amazing" president when he was unrestrained. "There was a lot of fawning back and forth," the source added.

On November 24, West released a video in which he stated that Trump was "very impressed" by Fuentes. West also stated that Trump began screaming at him and telling him that he was going to lose after West asked Trump to be his vice-presidential candidate, stating, "Trump started basically screaming at me at the table telling me I was going to lose — I mean has that ever worked for anyone in history. I'm like hold on, hold on, hold on, Trump, you're talking to Ye".

Aftermath and reactions

The meeting received significant attention and comment from domestic and international political figures. The nature of the event — in which a former President hosted guests with open antisemitic beliefs — was considered "unprecedented" in the modern era and garnered intense bipartisan criticism of Trump, with Republican leaders in Congress making a rare rebuke of Trump. The scandal raised questions over Trump’s tenability as a candidate in the 2024 election. Among American Jews, the ensuing discussion since the dinner has been described as the "most discomforting moment in U.S. history in a half-century or more." Commentators and politicians argued Trump's failure to condemn antisemitism and racism from the guests is implicit acceptance of their beliefs.

Initially, Trump had attempted to defend the dinner in tweet assuring critics that West had "expressed no antisemitic views at the dinner table."

According to The Washington Post, Trump initially believed that the events of the evening would "blow over". But by December 1, the subsequent actions of Kanye and Fuentes after the dinner had "paint[ed] a different picture" of the situation.

According to Hugo Lowell, Trump "refused to disavow the outspoken" Fuentes "after they spoke over dinner at his Mar-a-Lago resort", and that he "urged publicly and privately to denounce Fuentes in the aftermath of the dinner", which included West.

According to The New York Times, "Trump’s inner orbit is keenly aware he’s lost the excitement of 2016 and there’s a school of thought that ginning up the most die-hard of his base is key to bringing it back…that means reaching out to fringe, racist elements" and that it represented Trump aligning "himself with forces that used to be outside the mainstream of American politics." Additionally stating that he "has embraced extremist elements in American society even more unabashedly than in the past" and that "Analysts and strategists see Mr. Trump’s pivot toward the far right as a tactic to re-create political momentum that the former president may be losing, with at least some polls showing him trailing Gov. Ron DeSantis of Florida for the Republican nomination in 2024."

Commentator Charlie Sykes argued that: "Trump has been consistent in his reluctance to offend what he regards as a crucial part of the base that he has nurtured over the years. He is unapologetic about associating with overt neo-Nazis, and unwilling to issue full-throated denunciations of antisemitism. Trump is willing to draw this barrage of opprobrium for one simple reason: He believes that he has tapped into something in the American electorate, especially among evangelical Christians, who have ingrained — but complicated — attitudes toward Israel and Jews."

Response from political leaders

White House Deputy Press Secretary Andrew Bates stated on November 26, 2022, that "Bigotry, hate, and antisemitism have absolutely no place in America - including at Mar-A-Lago" and that "Holocaust denial is repugnant and dangerous, and it must be forcefully condemned".

Republican House leader Kevin McCarthy condemned the meeting, while not specifically condemning Trump for his actions.

Democratic Senate leader Chuck Schumer condemned the meeting, calling it "disgusting and dangerous" and "pure evil". Republican Senate minority leader Mitch McConnell condemned the meeting, stating: "Let me just say that there is no room in the Republican Party for antisemitism or white supremacy."

Republican senators also criticized the meeting, with some saying it raised the profile of racists and antisemites. Among the Republican senators that issued statements condemning the meeting were Bill Cassidy of Louisiana, Rick Scott of Florida, Mitt Romney of Utah, Shelley Moore Capito of West Virginia, Susan Collins of Maine, Rob Portman of Ohio, Tommy Tuberville of Alabama, Roy Blunt of Missouri, and Joni Ernst of Iowa. Additionally, Marco Rubio of Florida referred to Fuentes as "evil" and "an ass clown."

Republican governor Larry Hogan of Maryland called the meeting "disgraceful and unconscionable" and that "...it's so disgraceful and more people should be speaking up". Adding that "we need to stop talking about Donald Trump" and that "The party and the country need to move on from him". Adding that "There is no place for antisemitism or white supremacists in the Republican Party and no place for anyone who gives people like Nick Fuentes the time of day. Donald Trump’s recent actions and history of poor judgment make him untenable as a candidate for our party".

Former Vice President Mike Pence, who served during Trump's term in office, stated: "I think he should apologize for it, and he should denounce those individuals and their hateful rhetoric without qualification".

Response from the Jewish community

Rabbi Rick Jacobs, president of the Union for Reform Judaism, stated in an interview with The Washington Post, that it "gave them [those with antisemitic views] a credibility that should have been unimaginable" and antisemitism "to the highest echelon of political life" and that "I never imagined this would be the day-to-day reality of our world".

Jonathan Greenblatt of the Anti-Defamation League stated: "I would characterize this as the normalization of antisemitism. It has now become part of the political process in a way we hadn’t seen before" and that "And that is not unique to Republicans. It is not just a Republican problem. It is a societal problem".

Israeli Prime Minister-designate Benjamin Netanyahu labeled the meeting a "mistake" for Trump to meet with West and Fuentes. In a follow up interview, he stated: "...On this matter, on Kanye West and that other unacceptable guest [Nick Fuentes], I think it's not merely unacceptable, it's just wrong. And I hope he sees his way to staying out of it and condemning it."

In the response to the meeting—and subsequent interviews from Fuentes and West about it—Israeli Ambassador to the United States, Michael Herzog, stated: "At a time when antisemitism is on the rise, it is alarming that such vile rhetoric is given a platform and legitimized" and that West and Fuentes "engaged in hateful incitement, which could lead to violence and the death of Jews in horrifying incidents".

According to The New York Times, for American Jews,  "the debate since the dinner has brought into focus what may be the most discomfiting moment in U.S. history in a half-century or more".

The Rolling Stone reported on December 7, 2022, that: "Republican Jewish activists,  leaders, and perennial GOP donors are waging a behind-the-scenes pressure campaign to force Donald Trump into denouncing and disowning rapper Kanye West, Trump’s on-and-off friend and political supporter" along Nick Fuentes.

Fuentes later announced that he had joined West's presidential campaign.

Political views 
Fuentes has stated that his goal is to turn the Republican Party into "a truly reactionary party." Fuentes strongly opposes immigration, which he believes is a demographic threat to the United States. Fuentes also opposes feminism and conservatism, claiming that "Christian Republican voters get screwed over" because "the GOP is run by Jews, atheists, and homosexuals."

White supremacy and antisemitism 
Fuentes has spoken positively of "a tidal wave of white identity" following his attendance of the 2017 Charlottesville Unite the Right rally and sees America's "white demographic core" as central to the country's identity. Despite promoting white supremacist beliefs, such as the white genocide conspiracy theory, Fuentes has claimed that he is not a white supremacist, calling the term an "anti-white slur". Fuentes wants the United States to be a White, Christian country and has specified that it is not a "Judeo-Christian" country.

Fuentes also holds antisemitic views and denies the Holocaust. In January 2019, Fuentes aired a monologue in which he implied he questions the death toll of 6 million Jews in the Holocaust. Fuentes later disputed that he had ever denied the Holocaust, calling his monologue a "lampoon". NPR cites this as an example of Fuentes' use of irony to avoid consequences for his words, citing a 2020 video where Fuentes said, "Irony is so important for giving a lot of cover and plausible deniability for our views" specifically regarding Holocaust denial.

During his speech at AFPAC 2022, Fuentes bestowed "giggling praise" on Adolf Hitler.

Vladimir Putin 
During the AFPAC speech in which he praised Hitler, Fuentes said that the media had been comparing Vladimir Putin to Hitler "as if that wasn't a good thing". Fuentes also asked the audience "Can we get a round of applause for Russia?", which was followed by roaring applause and chants of "Putin! Putin!"

On March 10, Fuentes praised "czar Putin" for the 2022 Russian invasion of Ukraine, which he claimed was to "Liberate Ukraine from the Great Satan and from the evil empire in the world, which is the United States."

Catholic integralism and Christian nationalism 
Fuentes self-identifies as a Catholic integralist and Christian nationalist. He has stated "You're either a Catholic or you're with the Jews", and has voiced support for a Catholic media, Catholic Hollywood, and Catholic government. Fuentes supports a Christian theocracy instead of what he calls a "Jewish-occupied government".

In March 2022, Fuentes stated that he is a reactionary who supports autocracy and called himself "a 12th century man", adding "Catholic autocracy? Pretty strong. Pretty strong record. Catholic monarchy? Catholic monarchy, and just war, and crusades, and inquisitions? Pretty good stuff." Fuentes also decried democracy, saying "You know what democracy has given us? Obesity. Low rates of literacy. It's given us divorce, abortion, gay marriage, liberalism, pornography. That's what democracy has given us. Ghettos and crime and political correctness. Diversity. Yeah, the track record of democracy? Not so good."

COVID-19 
Fuentes has frequently spread conspiracy theories and misinformation surrounding the FDA-approved COVID-19 vaccines.

In December 2020, Fuentes reportedly had an altercation on a flight over mask mandates. In April 2021, Salon reported that "Nicholas Fuentes and his 'groyper army' have joined forces with the coronavirus anti-vaccine community". That year, he embarked on an anti-vaccine speaking tour, where he promoted hoaxes about COVID-19 vaccines.

LGBT and women's rights 
He has spoken out against the "LGBT agenda", and has described transgender people and same-sex marriage as "deviancy".

Following the Dobbs v. Jackson decision that overturned Roe v. Wade in June 2022, Fuentes praised the Supreme Court of the United States for overturning that decision. He said that "Jews stood in the way" of doing so, and that the Dobbs decision meant that "banning gay marriage is back on the menu, banning sodomy is back on the menu, banning contraceptives is back on the menu, and basically we're having something like Taliban rule in America, in a good way."

In a documentary for the BBC, broadcast in 2022, Fuentes told the interviewer, Louis Theroux, that he believes it would be better if women did not have the right to vote.

Taliban 
Fuentes has praised the conservative religious aspect of Taliban governance. After the Afghan government fell to the Taliban while American forces were withdrawing in August 2021, Fuentes posted on the Telegram messaging service, "The Taliban is a conservative, religious force, the US is godless and liberal. The defeat of the US government in Afghanistan is unequivocally a positive development."

Social media
Fuentes' show, America First, has attracted a cult following, which Fuentes refers to as the "Groypers" or the "Groyper Army". Fuentes cites the candidacy and presidency of Donald Trump as an inspiration for America First. In February 2022, social media platform Truth Social verified Fuentes' account.

Deplatforming 
Fuentes has been deplatformed from various social media websites, payment processors, and other services. In January 2020, Fuentes' YouTube channel was demonetized and one of his videos was removed by YouTube as a violation of their hate speech policies. Fuentes had previously been banned from Twitch and from Reddit. On February 14, 2020, his YouTube channel was terminated for violating policies on hate speech. In January 2020, Time reported that Fuentes was the most-viewed live-streamer on the DLive platform. DLive was criticized for allowing Fuentes to use their platform.

Following the January 6 United States Capitol attack, his DLive channel was subsequently suspended permanently for "inciting violent and illegal activities". According to ABC News in March 2021, Fuentes had been suspended from "almost all" social media platforms. Fuentes claimed that his bank account had been frozen, that he had been placed on a federal no-fly list, and that he had been banned from Airbnb, Facebook and Instagram. Fuentes described these actions as "overt political persecution".

Twitter was among the last mainstream social media sites to ban Fuentes, permanently suspending his verified account in July 2021. He has also been banned from financial and e-commerce services, including PayPal, Venmo, Patreon, Shopify, Stripe, Streamlabs, and Coinbase. On January 25, 2023, his verified Twitter account was briefly reinstated. According to Hannah Gais, a senior researcher at the Southern Poverty Law Center, he immediately praised Hitler and the Unabomber and declared: "Jews run the news." Twitter banned him again the next day.

Following the deplatforming from major providers such as Twitter, YouTube, Facebook, Instagram, and DLive, Fuentes collaborated with Alex Jones to launch his own live-streaming platform Cozy.tv in October 2021. Since then, Fuentes has amassed a following of 106,000 followers across alternative social media sites Truth Social, Rumble, Cozy.tv and Telegram. Fuentes is styled by Vice journalist Tess Owens as "the kingpin of the ultranationalist youth movement".

In December 2021, social media platform Gettr permanently suspended Fuentes. The site received backlash from Fuentes' fanbase, as well as from Arizona State Senator Wendy Rogers, who wrote, "What is the point of a free-speech alternative to Twitter... that doesn't even honor free speech?". Gettr subsequently banned all use of the word "groyper" on the platform.

References

External links 

 

1998 births
21st-century Roman Catholics
Alt-right activists
American conspiracy theorists
American Holocaust deniers
American people of Mexican descent
American political commentators
American Roman Catholics
American white supremacists
American YouTubers
Anti-Americanism
American fascists
Christian nationalists
Discrimination against LGBT people in the United States
Hispanic and Latino American people
Living people
Paleoconservatism
People from La Grange Park, Illinois
Protesters in or near the January 6 United States Capitol attack
Right-wing populism in the United States
YouTube controversies